The 2000 Open Gaz de France was a women's tennis tournament played on indoor carpet courts at the Stade Pierre de Coubertin in Paris, France and was part of Tier II of the 2000 WTA Tour. It was the eighth edition of the tournament and ran from 7 February until 13 February 2000. Second-seeded Nathalie Tauziat won the singles title and earned $87,000 first-prize money.

Finals

Singles

 Nathalie Tauziat defeated  Serena Williams 7–6(7–2), 6–1
 It was Tauziat's only singles title of the year and the 7th of her career.

Doubles

 Julie Halard-Decugis /  Sandrine Testud defeated  Åsa Carlsson /  Émilie Loit 3–6, 6–3, 6–4

References

External links
 ITF tournament edition details
 Tournament draws

Open Gaz de France
Open GDF Suez
Open Gaz de France
Open Gaz de France
Open Gaz de France
Open Gaz de France